The 1930 USC Trojans football team represented the University of Southern California (USC) in the 1930 college football season. In their sixth year under head coach Howard Jones, the Trojans compiled an 8–2 record (5–1 in the Pacific Coast Conference, runner-up), and outscored their opponents 382 to 66.

Schedule

References

External links
 Official game program: USC at Washington State – October 11, 1930

USC
USC Trojans football seasons
USC Trojans football